Rideau Correctional Centre was opened in 1947 as a minimum-security facility, with an integrated farm where inmates could learn skills to be plied upon their release.  It was decommissioned in 2004, and subsequently demolished in 2013.

References

Defunct prisons in Ontario
Demolished buildings and structures in Ottawa
Buildings and structures demolished in 2013
1947 establishments in Ontario
2004 disestablishments in Ontario